The 2021–22 Dream11 Men's Super Smash (named after the competition's sponsor Dream11) was the seventeenth season of the Men's Super Smash Twenty20 cricket tournament that was played in New Zealand. In July 2021, New Zealand Cricket (NZC) named all the squads for the domestic teams ahead of the 2021–22 season, and confirmed that the matches would mainly be played at the weekend. On 27 October 2021, NZC confirmed the full fixtures for the tournament. The Wellington Firebirds were the defending champions.

Prior to the tournament, the Northern Districts T20 team, previously known as the Northern Knights, was rebranded as the Northern Brave. Northern Brave finished top of the group stage to secure a place in the final of the tournament at their home ground of Seddon Park in Hamilton. The Canterbury Kings and the Wellington Firebirds both qualified for the elimination final. In the elimination match, the Canterbury Kings beat the Wellington Firebirds by six wickets to advance to the final. The Northern Brave won the tournament, beating the Canterbury Kings by 56 runs in the final.

Points table

 Advances to the Final
 Advances to the Eliminator

Fixtures

Round-robin

Finals

Notes

References

External links
Series home at ESPN Cricinfo

2021–22 New Zealand cricket season
Super Smash
Super Smash (cricket)